The Serra de Granera is a mountain range located between the Vallès Occidental and Vallès Oriental comarcas in Catalonia, Spain.

References 

Granera
Vallès Occidental
Vallès Oriental